Lesčiukai is a village in Kėdainiai district municipality, in Kaunas County, in central Lithuania. According to the 2011 census, the village had a population of 15 people. There is a farm.

Lesčiukai was established in the former lands of Lesčiai folwark.

Demography

References

Villages in Kaunas County
Kėdainiai District Municipality